Libongo or Libogo is a village in the Bas-Uélé province of the Democratic Republic of the Congo. It was a stop on the defunct Vicicongo line, a railway.

Location

Libongo is in the Aketi Territory of Bas-Uélé.
The village is on the RN4 road to the northwest of Likati just past the point where a mixed-use bridge carries the road and railway across the Likati River.
The road continues north to Bondo.
As of 2014 the mixed-use bridge at Libogo was defective and dangerous for road users.

Former railway

The Komba–Likati–Libongo–Bondo railway was a branch line from the main Vicicongo line from Aketi to Neja-Mawa.
The line was built by the Société des Chemins de Fer Vicinaux du Congo.
The  section from Likati to Libogo opened in September 1927.
The  section from Libogo to Bondo opened on 15 May 1928.

Notes

Sources

Populated places in Bas-Uélé